Pantops may refer to:

 Pantops, Virginia, a census-designated place in Albemarle County, Virginia
 Pantops Academy, a school in Charlottesville, Virginia
 Pantops Mountain, a mountain in Charlottesville, Virginia